Ashok Singhal (born 29 December 1968, Guwahati, Assam)  is an Indian politician of Bharatiya Janata Party, Assam Pradesh and the current Minister of Housing & Urban Affairs and Irrigation, Government of Assam. He is also the Guardian Minister of three districts of Assam, namely Kokrajhar, Udalguri and Cachar. He was elected for the first time to Assam Legislative Assembly in 2016 from Dhekiajuli constituency. In 2021 Assembly election, he got re-elected from the same constituency.

Personal life 
He was born on 29 December 1968 to Late Parmananda Singhal and Smti Indumati Singhal is his mother. He is a resident of Kumarpara, Guwahati, Assam. He  married Smt Silpi Anand Singhal in 1992, with whom he has two sons: Lokesh Anand Singhal and Vivek Anand Singhal.

Education 
He did his graduation from the Gauhati Commerce College in 1990. He also has a Post Graduate Diploma in Management (PGDM).

Political career 
Ashok Singhal was a member of Rashtriya Swayamsevak Sangh (RSS). He was also a student leader of Akhil Bharatiya Vidyarthi Parishad (ABVP). Later he joined BJP and became the spokesperson of BJP Assam Pradesh.  He was also the Secretary and Treasurer of Assam BJP. He was elected as an MLA to the Assam Legislative Assembly for the first time in 2016 from Dhekiajuli constituency. He is also known as a 'Man of development', for his work in Dhekiajuli. As an active leader and legislator, he made Dhekiajuli one of the most developed constituencies of Assam. He won the 2016 election against Habul Chakraborty (Congress Party Candidate) by 71,425 votes. Singhal was re-elected to Assam Legislative Assembly in 2021 from Dhekiajuli with 93,768 votes defeating Benudhar Nath of Congress party. Ashok Singhal is also a well known businessman and a social worker. He runs an NGO named 'Jana Jagriti'.

Journey with Jana Jagriti 
Ashok Singhal runs an NGO in Assam named Jana Jagriti. Saving mighty river Brahmaputra was one of most important movements started by Jana Jagriti. Ashok Singhal has been the chief of this organization.

The movement to save the Brahmaputra reached its peak when in the year 2010, Jana Jagriti claimed that China was not only diverting water from the Brahmaputra (called Yarlung Zangto in China) at Great Band by constructing a tunnel but also undertaking a series of infrastructure development projects along the Tibetan plateau.

Save River Brahmaputra Campaign 
Guwahati-based NGO, Jana Jagriti, under the leadership of activist-politician Ashok Singhal spearheaded a campaign named 'Save River Brahmaputra' on the threats posed by dams on Brahmaputra in China in 2010. Few believed him when he first highlighted a series of Chinese hydro-power projects on the Yarlung Tsangpo (also called Yarlung Zangbo in China and Brahmaputra in India), through satellite imageries and warned people and the governments in the northeastern states of the danger of the mighty river slowly getting dried up. Later, he was vindicated when Beijing officially intimated New Delhi on blocking a Tsangpo tributary in September, 2016.

His NGO, Jana Jagriti, in 2016 claimed that China was working on 26 power projects. The NGO believed that once those projects get commissioned, the flow of Tsangpo water into India will be reduced by 64% during monsoon and 85% during the non-monsoon months. According to Jana Jagriti, India receives 78.10 BCM water from China through Brahmaputra at its entry point at Gorging village in Arunachal. The receipt of the water during the monsoon months is 56.12 BCM and during the non-monsoon period, it is 21.98 BCM.

References 
11. Assam: Ashok Singhal is new GDD Minister

https://guwahatitimes.com/assam-ashok-singhal-is-new-guwahati-development-minister/?amp=1

Living people
Bharatiya Janata Party politicians from Assam
Assam MLAs 2016–2021
Politicians from Guwahati
1968 births
Assam MLAs 2021–2026